The Honorary Order of the Yellow Star (Dutch: Ere-Orde van de Gele Ster) is the highest state decoration of the Republic of Suriname. The Order was instituted in 1975 at the independence of Suriname and replaced the Dutch Order of the Netherlands Lion. It is awarded to individuals for their meritorious service to the Surinamese people or nation. Foreigners are also eligible to receive the order. The president of Suriname is the Grand Master of the order.

Classes
The Honorary Order of the Yellow Star is issued in five classes, plus two medals:

Grand Cordon (Grootlint), who wears the badge on a sash on the right shoulder, plus the star on the left side of the chest;
Grand Officer (Grootofficier), who wears a badge on a necklet, plus a star on the left side of the chest;
Commander (Commandeur), who wears the badge on a necklet;
Officer (Officier), who wears the badge on a ribbon with rosette on the left side of the chest;
Knight (Ridder), who wears the badge on a ribbon on the left side of the chest.
Honorary Medals in Gold and Silver on a ribbon on the left chest

The president of Suriname as Grand Master wears the collar of the order.

Insignia
The Collar of the Order is in gold, with alternating the "Sen" (S-shaped monogram) and gold stars as facets, connected with small chains. The whole chain rests on a folded Ribbon of the order that culminates in two bows. The bows are worn on the shoulders.

The Badge of the order exists of a gold gilt five-pointed star each topped with a small ball, and gold gilt rays between the arms, resulting in a badge with the shape of a pentagon. The central disk shows the yellow star of the Flag and Coat of arms of Suriname on white enamel, surrounded by a black enamel and gold edged ring displaying the motto in yellow (also from the Surinamese Coat of arms): JUSTITIA - PIETAS - FIDES ("Justice - Piety - Fidelity").

The Star of the Order is an eight-pointed gold gilt star with straight rays. The central disc is the same as that of the badge.

The Medal is round, with a gold and silver version. It shows the five-pointed star and a surrounding circlet with the motto of the order.

The Ribbon of the order is red with white stripes at the edges.

Controversy
After his inauguration in 2010, the Surinamese president Dési Bouterse immediately honoured all nine still living conspirators, who together with Bouterse were involved in the 1980 Surinamese coup d'état, with the Grand Cordon of the Honorary Order of the Yellow Star. This led internationally to great controversy, since all nine are accused of involvement in the December murders in 1982, when thirteen civilians and two military officials were murdered because they opposed the military rule in Suriname.

Selected recipients
Jules Ajodhia, a Surinamese politician and former Vice-President of Suriname
Prince Bernhard of Lippe-Biesterfeld, prince consort of Queen Juliana
Edwin W. Carrington, former Secretary-General of the Caribbean Community (CARICOM)
Beatrix of the Netherlands, former Queen Regnant of the Kingdom of the Netherlands
Juliana of the Netherlands, former Queen Regnant of the Kingdom of the Netherlands
Princess Margriet of the Netherlands, member of the Dutch Royal Family
Michiel van Kempen, Dutch writer
Gazon Matodya, former paramount chief (Granman) of the Ndyuka people
Johanna Schouten-Elsenhout, poet
Jules Sedney, a Surinamese politician and former Prime Minister of Suriname
Clarence Seedorf, Surinamese-Dutch football player
Tyrone Spong, Surinamese-Dutch Kickboxer and boxer
Ronald Venetiaan, a Surinamese politician and former President of Suriname
Pieter van Vollenhoven, member of the Dutch Royal House and husband of Princess Margriet of the Netherlands
Teodoro Obiang Nguema Mbasogo, President of Equatorial Guinea
Sri Sri Ravi Shankar, Founder The Art of Living Foundation  (IBTimes)

References
 

 
Yellow Star
Awards established in 1975
Orders of chivalry awarded to heads of state, consorts and sovereign family members